Aleksandr Vyacheslavovich Konev (born 2 April 2001) is a Russian football player. He plays for FC Chertanovo Moscow.

Club career
He made his debut in the Russian Professional Football League for FC Chertanovo-2 Moscow on 24 July 2018 in a game against FSK Dolgoprudny.

He made his Russian Football National League debut for FC Chertanovo Moscow on 13 April 2019 in a game against FC Tom Tomsk.

References

External links
 
 Profile by Russian Professional Football League

2001 births
Footballers from Moscow
Living people
Russian footballers
Association football forwards
Russia youth international footballers
FC Chertanovo Moscow players
FC Arsenal Tula players